The New Liberty Historic District in New Liberty, Kentucky is a  historic district which was listed on the National Register of Historic Places in 2001. It is located along Kentucky Route 227, roughly between KY 978 and KY 36.

The district includes 64 contributing buildings and five contributing sites.  Development in the district dates from 1815.

Selected properties include:
Garvey-Moody Residence (1880), a two-and-a-half-story brick house, mostly unchanged since originally built
New Liberty Post Office (1875), a commercial building, mostly unchanged since originally built

See also 
 Jacob Hunter House (New Liberty, Kentucky)
 National Register of Historic Places listings in Owen County, Kentucky

References

Historic districts on the National Register of Historic Places in Kentucky
Georgian architecture in Kentucky
Buildings and structures completed in 1815
National Register of Historic Places in Owen County, Kentucky